The Socialist Party of La Rioja (PSOE La Rioja) is the Riojan of the Spanish Socialist Workers' Party (PSOE), the main centre-left party in Spain since the 1970s.

Electoral performance

Parliament of La Rioja

Cortes Generales

European Parliament

References

La Rioja
Political parties in La Rioja (Spain)
Political parties with year of establishment missing
Social democratic parties in Spain